Chervyen massacre was one of the NKVD prisoner massacres. More than 1,000 political prisoners from Lithuania, Poland and Belarus were executed by the NKVD near Chervyen (present-day Belarus) on 25–27 June 1941.

Background 
At the outbreak of the German invasion of the Soviet Union on 22 June 1941, NKVD and NKGB hastily organized evacuation of numerous political prisoners into the interior of the Soviet Union. In many instances, instead of evacuating, NKVD carried out mass executions. Some of the evacuated prisoners, including about a hundred Lithuanians from Kaunas Prison, were gathered at the Pishchalauski Castle in Minsk which already housed a number of Polish prisoners, members of the Union of Armed Struggle.

Massacre 
On 25 June, about 2,000 prisoners were marched on foot by troops from the 42nd NKVD brigade to Chervyen. Along the way, about 500 prisoners were executed for failing to keep up. A Soviet report claimed that 209 prisoners were shot due to confusion and a German air attack. 

On 26 June, the remaining prisoners were placed in the Chervyen prison. A few criminal prisoners were released when they volunteered for the Red Army. Since prisoner files were destroyed by German bombardment in Minsk, the guards made their selection of 400–750 prisoners almost randomly. On the night from 26 to 27 June, the selected prisoners were marched from Chervyen towards Babruysk. Initially, the NKVD soldiers shot those prisoners that lagged behind. Of Lithuanian prisoners, about 40 survived.  

In total, about 200 prisoners escaped.

Commemoration 
The first commemoration of the massacre occurred in July 1990 when Lithuanian activists erected a wayside shrine and Belarusians a memorial cross.

Memoirs by survivors

Lithuanian memoirs 
 
 
  (originally published in 1942, second edition in 1944, republished in 1952 and 2003; Italian translation published in 1948 and 1968)
  (originally published in 1957 in magazine Karys)

Polish memoir

References

Massacres in 1941
Massacres committed by the Soviet Union
Massacres in Belarus
Mass murder in 1941
1941 in Belarus
June 1941 events
World War II massacres
NKVD operations
Soviet World War II crimes